Anderson Soares da Silva may refer to:

 Neneca (born 1980), Brazilian football goalkeeper
 Mazinho (footballer, born 1987), Brazilian football forward